Catherine Ann "Cottie" Petrie-Norris (born August 7, 1975) is an American politician who is in the California State Assembly. A Democrat, she represents the 73rd Assembly District, which encompasses inland Orange County communities of Costa Mesa,     Irvine, and Tustin. Prior to being elected, she was a small business owner and served on the Housing and Human Services Committee of Laguna Beach.

Petrie-Norris was first elected to the State Assembly in November 2018 after defeating the previous incumbent, Republican Matthew Harper.  In 2020, Petrie-Norris was elected to a second term by a very narrow margin over Newport Beach Mayor Diane Dixon.

After the once-a-decade redistricting, Petrie-Norris moved to Irvine to run in the new 73rd assembly. Her opponent Republican assembly member Steven Choi was very critical of her relocation to Irvine.

Petrie-Norris defeated Choi for reelection in the November 8, 2022, general election.

Electoral history

2018 California State Assembly election

2020 California State Assembly election

2022 California State Assembly Election

References

External links 
 
 Campaign website
 Join California Cottie Petrie-Norris

Democratic Party members of the California State Assembly
1975 births
Living people
People from Laguna Beach, California
Yale University alumni
21st-century American politicians
21st-century American women politicians
Women state legislators in California